Bejaria is a genus of flowering plants belonging to the family Ericaceae.

Its native range is Tropical and Subtropical America.

Species:

Bejaria aestuans 
Bejaria cubensis 
Bejaria imthurnii 
Bejaria infundibula 
Bejaria ledifolia 
Bejaria mathewsii 
Bejaria nana 
Bejaria neblinensis 
Bejaria racemosa 
Bejaria resinosa 
Bejaria sprucei 
Bejaria steyermarkii 
Bejaria subsessilis 
Bejaria tachirensis 
Bejaria zamorae

References

Ericaceae
Ericaceae genera